Immune usually refers to biological immunity to harmful organisms.

Immune may also refer to:

 Immune (album), by Soul Embraced, 2003
 "Immune", a song  by Godsmack from Godsmack, 1998
 "Immune", a song by Low from Secret Name, 1999
 "Immune", a song by Tinfed from Tried + True, 2000
 The Immune, a 2011 novel by Lucky Meisenheimer

See also

Immunity (disambiguation)